is a railway station located in the town of Happō, Akita Prefecture, Japan, operated by East Japan Railway Company (JR East).

Lines
Akitashirakami Station  is served by the  Gonō Line, and is located 26.1 kilometers from the southern terminus of the line at Higashi-Noshiro Station.

Station layout
The station has one side platform serving a single bidirectional track. The station is staffed.

History
Akitashirakami Station opened on October 1, 1997.

Passenger statistics
In fiscal 2018, the station was used by an average of 38 passengers daily (boarding passengers only). The passenger figures for previous years are as shown below.

Surrounding area
 
 Hachimori Isaribi onsen

See also
List of railway stations in Japan

References

External links

JR East station information page 
Akita-Shirakami Station description and tourism information by JR East Akita Division

Railway stations in Japan opened in 1997
Railway stations in Akita Prefecture
Gonō Line
Happō, Akita